Siesikai Castle is the residential castle near Siesikai, Ukmergė district, Lithuania. 
The castle on the Siesikai Lake was built by Gabrielius Daumantas-Siesickis in the 16th century in the Renaissance style. His heirs were known as Daumantai, also called Siesicki, had given their family name to the nearby town. The masonry palace was reconstructed in the Neoclassical style after 1820 by Dominik Dowgiałło. Only 2 towers remain from the former castle, which had four of them in every corner of the palace. The castle has been undergoing restoration since 1990.

See also
 Castles in Lithuania

External links

 Siesikai (Daugailiai) manor 
 The Association of Castles and Museums around the Baltic Sea

Castles in Lithuania
Renaissance architecture in Lithuania
Buildings and structures in Vilnius County
Tourist attractions in Vilnius County